Lewis McAdory Branscomb (born August 17, 1926) is an American physicist, government policy advisor, and corporate research manager.  He is best known as former head of the National Bureau of Standards and, later, chief scientist of IBM; and as a prolific writer on science policy issues.

Education and early life
Branscomb received a B.A. in physics from Duke University in 1945. He joined the navy reserves, where he deployed to the Philippines as a junior officer. He received his Ph.D. from Harvard in 1949, and remained two additional years as a Junior Fellow.  These years, and his interactions with scholars as diverse as Clyde Kluckhohn, Merle Fainsod, William Fairbank, and Edward Purcell, kindled a lifelong interest in broad policy issues. No less remembered from this period, Branscomb played the role of "Professor" in Tom Lehrer's 1951 "The Physical Revue", premiering several Lehrer songs in early versions.

Early career
Branscomb joined the U.S. National Bureau of Standards in 1951 as a research physicist.  Rising in management through several levels, he became the founding chair of the Joint Institute for Laboratory Astrophysics (JILA), and was in 1969 appointed director of the National Bureau of Standards by President Nixon. In 1972, Branscomb moved to IBM Corporation as vice president and chief scientist, and was later a member of the IBM Corporate Management Board.  In 1986, he moved to Harvard as director of the Science, Technology and Public Policy Program in the John F. Kennedy School of Government at Harvard University, holding that position until 1996.

Late career
Branscomb was a member of President Johnson's Science Advisory Committee (PSAC) from 1964 to 1968, during which time (a critical early period of the Apollo program) he chaired PSAC's Panel on Space Science and Technology.  Under President Reagan, he was a member of the National Productivity Advisory Committee and was chair of the National Science Board (1980-1984).  Other honors include president of the American Physical Society (1979), elected memberships in all three U.S. national academies (NAS, NAE, and IOM, as well as the American Philosophical Society), and honorary degrees from 15 universities.  In 1998, Branscomb was awarded the Okawa Prize "for outstanding contributions to the progress of informatics, scientific and technological policy and corporate management." He serves on the Advisory Board of the Journal of Science Policy & Governance. Branscomb is a Fellow of National Academy of Public Administration (United States).

Works
Branscomb is an author of more than 500 scholarly publications and 11 books.  He has served on the boards of several corporations (including General Foods and Mobil) and many non-profit organizations.  For a continuous period of 57 years Branscomb and/or his father, B. Harvie Branscomb, served as a trustee of Vanderbilt University.

Publications
 Beyond Spinoff: Military and Commercial Technologies in a Changing World, (with J. Alic, et al., 1992)
 Empowering Technology: Implementing a U.S. Policy (1993)
 Confessions of a Technophile (1994)
 Converging Infrastructures: Intelligent Transportation and the National Information Infrastructure (with James Keller, 1996)
 Informed Legislatures: Coping with Science in a Democracy (with Megan Jones and David Guston, 1996)
 Korea at the Turning Point: Innovation-Based Strategies for Development (with H.Y. Choi, 1996)
 Investing in Innovation: Creating a Research and Innovation Policy that Works (with James Keller, eds., 1998)
 Industrializing Knowledge: University-Industry Linkages in Japan and the United States (with Fumio Kodama and Richard Florida, eds., 1999)
 Taking Technical Risks: How Innovators, Executives, and Investors Manage High-Tech Risks (with Philip E. Auerswald, 2001),
 Making the Nation Safer: The Role of Science and Technology in Countering Terrorism (co-chaired with Richard Klausner, Committee on S&T for Countering Terrorism, National Academies, 2002)
 Seeds of Disaster, Roots of Response: How Private Action can Reduce Public Vulnerability (with P. Auerswald, Todd M. LaPorte, and E. Michel-Kerjan, Cambridge University Press, September 2006)

References

External links

 
 Oral history interview transcript with Lewis Branscomb, American Institute of Physics, Niels Bohr Library & Archives

1926 births
Living people
NIST Directors
Members of the United States National Academy of Engineering
Members of the United States National Academy of Sciences
Foreign Members of the Russian Academy of Sciences
Harvard Kennedy School faculty
IBM employees
Webb School (Bell Buckle, Tennessee) alumni
Harvard University alumni
United States Navy officers
20th-century American engineers
20th-century American physicists
Fellows of the American Physical Society
United States Navy reservists
United States Navy personnel of World War II
Members of the National Academy of Medicine
Presidents of the American Physical Society